Cornelius "Con" Strouthers was a baseball manager in the late 19th century and early 20th century. From 1895 to 1896, he was the third manager of the Detroit Tigers during their time in the Western League before they became a major league team in 1901. In 1904 he was the manager of the Augusta Tourists of the South Atlantic League or "Sally League" when he invited Ty Cobb, who would go on to a Hall of Fame career with the Tigers, to join the club.

References

Stump, Al (1994). Cobb:  A Biography. Algonquin Books of Chapel Hill.

External links

Year of birth missing
Year of death missing
Detroit Tigers managers
Bozeman Irrigators players
Augusta Tourists players